Moke Village is a village under Konch block of Bihar state, India. This village is situated near Tekari sub-division. One canal called Sone Canal System passes through the village, which helps to irrigate the agricultural land. Rice, pulses and sugar cane are produced from the land. As the village does not have a sugar mill, agriculturalists convert the sugar cane into boiled sugar or raw sugar.

The election census code is 03966000.

The Konch block has the following villages:

 Achuki 
 Adai 
 Alpa 
 Amra 
 Angra 
 Ansara 
 Anti 
 Barai 
 Bargawan 
 Barhauna 
 Basatpur 
 Bedauli 
 Bham 
 Bhikhanpur 
 Bijahari 
 Birnawan 
 Bishunathpur 
 Chainpur 
 Chandaini 
 Chechaura 
 Chobra 
 Daulatpur 
 Daurawan 
 Dhan Chhuha 
 Dhan Chhuhi 
 Dharahra 
 Dhibri 
 Digghi 
 Ekariya 
 Gangti 
 Gauharpur 
 Gen Bigha 
 Ghoraha 
 Gorkati 
 Hasanpur 
 Huse Chak 
 Jagdishpur 
 Jahana 
 Kabar 
 Kachanpur 
 Kailash Math 
 Kairiya Madanpur 
 Kalyanpur 
 Kanaudi 
 Karai 
 Kasturi Khap 
 Kathutia 
 Kauriya 
 Ker 
 Khabhra 
 Khaira 
 Khajuri 
 Khatnahi 
 Korap 
 Kunin 
 Lodipur 
 Madanpur 
 Majathi 
 Majhiawan 
 Mithapur 
 Mok 
 Murera 
 Nasirpur 
 Nehura 
 Newdhi 
 Nighai 
 Nimri 
 Pakri 
 Palanki 
 Panda Bigha 
 Pardhana 
 Parrawan 
 Parsanwan 
 Rajaura 
 Rampur 
 Rewara Pakar 
 Rupaspur 
 Salempur 
 Salono Bigha 
 Sarbahada 
 Shahganj 
 Siari 
 Simra 
 Simrahua 
 Tineri 
 Tuturkhi 
 Usas 
 Wahab Chak

References 

Villages in Gaya district